Halfdan Lehmann (1825-1908) was a Norwegian state secretary 1879–1906, temporary councillor of state to the Minister of Education and Church Affairs in 1881, temporary Minister of the Navy in 1884, and the appointed Minister of Education and Church Affairs in 1884.

1825 births
1908 deaths
Government ministers of Norway